Jane Alexander (born 1972) is a British-born naturalized Italian actress.

Life and career 
Born in Watford, the daughter of two voice actors, at a young age Alexander moved to Rome with her family, where she started working as a dubber while still a child. At 16 years old she started working as a model, and in 1993 she made her acting debut in the comedy film Women Don't Want To. In 2001 she also debuted as a presenter, hosting the La7 game show Zengi.

Alexander's breakout role came in 2003, with the villain Lucrezia Van Necker in the Canale 5 TV-series Elisa di Rivombrosa, a role she reprised in the 2007 sequel La figlia di Elisa – Ritorno a Rivombrosa. She later appeared in other successful TV-series, notably Ho sposato un calciatore, Anna e i cinque and Il commissario Manara.  Since 2011 Alexander has hosted the Italia 1 show Mistero.

Private life 
In Rome, on August 10, 2003 she became the mother of Damiano Lorenzo, born from then-partner Christian Schiozzi, who works in the film and television production sector.

Filmography

Films

Television

References

External links 
 

1972 births
Living people
British emigrants to Italy
British film actresses
British television actresses
British voice actresses
People from Watford
20th-century British actresses
21st-century British actresses
Italian people of British descent